Fauconer may refer to:

John Fauconer, MP for Devizes (UK Parliament constituency)
William Fauconer,  MP for Hampshire (UK Parliament constituency)
William Fauconer (died 1412), JP (Hants, 1407–1412), MP for Hampshire (1407 and 1411), buried in St. Mary's, Kingsclere.

References